Alexander II (1527 – March 12, 1605) of the Bagrationi Dynasty, was a king of Kakheti in eastern Georgia from 1574 to 1605. In spite of a precarious international situation, he managed to retain relative economic stability in his kingdom and tried to establish contacts with the Tsardom of Russia. Alexander fell victim to the Iran-sponsored coup led by his own son, Constantine I.

Early reign and political alliances 

Alexander was a son of King Levan of Kakheti by his first wife Tinatin Gurieli. Upon Levan's death in 1574, Alexander secured his succession in a power struggle with his half-brothers – El-Mirza and Kaikhosro – and their party. He was aided by his kinsman and western neighbor, David XI of Kartli (Daud Khan), who sent auxiliary troops under the princes Bardzim Amilakhvari and Elizbar of the Ksani, and helped Alexander crush the opponents at the Battle of Torgi.

Alexander II continued a traditional policy of his predecessors aimed at keeping peace with the neighbors of Kakheti. This, for the time being, secured the economic stability and prosperity in the kingdom. However, he faced a difficult task of maneuvering between the Ottomans and Safavid Iran as both empires vied for the hegemony in the Caucasus. Although Alexander was initially a vassal, at least nominally, of the Safavids, he repudiated his allegiance to the Shah of Iran and accepted the Ottoman suzerainty when the latter empire gained the upper hand in 1578. The move did not prevent, however, Kakheti from being attacked by the mountainous subjects of the Shamkhal of Tarki who was apparently instigated by the Ottoman agents. Alexander decided to resume his father's efforts to establish alliance with the Tsardom of Russia. After exchanging ambassadors in 1586–1587, Alexander received the protection of Tsar Feodor I of Russia, signing the Book of Pledge in 1589. Russian troops were sent against the shamkhal in a brief campaign of 1592. Little else came of the Russian promises, leading to a series of complaints by Alexander to the tsar's ambassadors.

Between 1596 and 1597, envoys of Alexander II, Simon I of Kartli, and Manuchehr of Samtshke arrived at the Safavid court, including slave boys and girls, who were entertained by Prince Constantine (also known as Kunstandil), the son of Alexander II himself, who had been brought up at the Safavid court.

Downfall 
In October 1601, Alexander's son, David, revolted from the royal authority and seized the crown, forcing his father to retire to a monastery. David died a year later, on October 2, 1602, and Alexander was able to resume the throne. Meanwhile, Iran started to regain what had earlier been lost to the Ottomans. The energetic Shah Abbas I laid a siege to the Ottoman-held fortress of Erivan in November 1603 and summoned Alexander to his headquarters. After months of hesitation, Alexander acceded, massacred the Ottoman garrison in Tiflis, and arrived at Erivan in April 1604. Early in 1605, Shah Abbas sent him back with orders to raid Shirvan. He was accompanied by his son, Constantine, who had been raised at the Safavid court as a convert to Islam.

Back in Kakheti, Alexander found a new Russian embassy requesting his support in a projected campaign against the shamkhal. The Russian envoys had already been favorably received by Alexander's son, George, who ran the kingdom in his father's absence. Dissatisfied by this maneuver, Constantine demanded the loyal execution of the shah's orders. On March 12, 1605, Alexander summoned a council at Zagem. Within hours, Constantine led his Qizilbash entourage into a bloody coup against his own father; Alexander, George and several of their nobles were massacred. Constantine was made by the shah king of Kakheti, and the Safavid suzerainty was, for the time being, reasserted in the kingdom.

Family 
Alexander II was married to Tinatin, daughter of Prince Bardzim Amilakhvari, who bore him five or six sons and two daughters:
Erekle (1568–1586)
David I of Kakheti (1569–1602)
George (1570–1605)
Constantine I (1571–1605)
Rostom (died 1579)
Anton (died 1590), not mentioned in Cyril Toumanoff's traditional genealogy
Anna; married Bagrat VII of Kartli
Nestan-Darejan (died 1591); married Manuchar I Dadiani, Prince of Mingrelia
Tinatina, married in 1579 Sultan Hamza Mirza (1566–1586), a son of Shah Mohammed Khodabanda.

Ancestry

References

Sources 
 

1527 births
1605 deaths
Bagrationi dynasty of the Kingdom of Kakheti
Kings of Kakheti
17th-century murdered monarchs
16th-century people of Safavid Iran
17th-century people of Safavid Iran
Murder in 1605